Papilio pelaus, the prickly ash swallowtail, is a species of Neotropical swallowtail butterfly from the genus Papilio that is found in Jamaica, Hispaniola, Cuba and Puerto Rico.

Description
With spatulate tail. Sexes similar, but the markings in the female somewhat enlarged and on the hindwing more numerous than in the male. Black, forewing with oblique white band from the costa to the anal angle: hindwing with complete (female) or incomplete (male) row of pale red submarginal spots: beneath there are usually also small discal spots present, which sometimes in the female also occur above.

Subspecies
Papilio pelaus pelaus (Jamaica)
Papilio pelaus imerius Godart, 1819 (Hispaniola) the band of the forewing is narrower anteriorly, on the other hand its last spot is on the whole broader than in the nominate and the spots on the hindwing are smaller.
Papilio pelaus atkinsi Bates, 1935 (Cuba)
Papilio pelaus puertoricoensis (Möhn, 1999) (Puerto Rico)

See also
List of butterflies of Jamaica

References

Lewis, H. L., 1974 Butterflies of the World  Page 25, figure 9
F. Martin Brown and Bernard Heineman, Jamaica and its Butterflies (E. W. Classey, London 1972), plate VIII

External links
Butterflycorner Images from Naturhistorisches Museum Wien

pelaus
Butterflies described in 1775
Fauna of the Caribbean
Insects of the Dominican Republic
Papilionidae of South America
Butterflies of Jamaica
Taxa named by Johan Christian Fabricius